Houck Stadium is an 11,015-seat multi-purpose stadium in Cape Girardeau, Missouri. It opened in 1930 and was named after famous Missouri resident Louis Houck. Today it is home to the Southeast Missouri State University Redhawks football team and women's soccer team.

The stadium used to be open on both the east and west side. Today, it is open only on the east side. On the west end of the stadium, where KRCU once stood, is a brand new, 5-story residence hall for Southeast students, with some of the rooms looking out over the stadium. The stadium is flanked on the southwest side by Houck Fieldhouse, which houses the Southeast Missouri State volleyball team.

History
Houck Stadium was constructed in 1930 at a cost of $150,000.  It was built on the site of a former rock quarry, which was purchased for $11,000 in 1925.  It was dedicated on October 3, 1930 before a crowd of over 6,000 people.  Southeast Missouri defeated Southern Illinois University that day 12–6.  Houck Stadium originally consisted of 5,240 seats on the south side of the field.  It was named for Louis Houck, who served 39 years as a regent for the University and as President of the Board for 36 years.

Seating on the north side of the stadium was added prior to the 1963 season.  A press box was constructed on the south side of the stadium in 1979.  Nearly 400 chairback seats were added in 1992 on the south side.

Single game attendance records

See also
 List of NCAA Division I FCS football stadiums

References

College football venues
American football venues in Missouri
Southeast Missouri State Redhawks football
Multi-purpose stadiums in the United States
Soccer venues in Missouri
Buildings and structures in Cape Girardeau, Missouri
Sports venues in Missouri